Faustas Latėnas (16 May 19563 November 2020) was a Lithuanian composer, theatre manager, politician and diplomat. He composed mostly incidental music, and also scores for films and television. He was vice-minister of the Lithuanian Ministry of Culture, advisor to the prime minister in cultural affairs, and cultural attaché in Moscow.

Life and career 
He shared his teacher's love for Latin American dances. His first position was director of music at the puppet theatre , becoming the theatre's director in 1990. From 1991, he was director of music department at the National Small Theatre of Vilnius.

From 1996, he was vice-minister of the Lithuanian Ministry of Culture, also the country's advisor for cultural affairs the following year. He was from 1999 director of the National Drama Theatre, and from 2000 director of the National Small Theatre of Vilnius. In 2005, he served again as vice-minister. From 2006 to 2008, he was cultural advisor to the Prime Minister. He was cultural attaché at the Embassy of Lithuania in Moscow from 2011 to 2012, and then again advisor to the Prime Minister until 2016.

Latėnas received the Lithuanian National Culture and Art Prize for "The sounding Lithuanian theatre, and music as a worthwhile counterpart in theatrical action". In June 2016, the Lithuanian National Philharmonic Society organised a concert on the occasion of his 60th birthday, entitled Faustas Latėnas. Music as Theatre. Instrumental soloists and ensembles, the Vilnius State Choir and the Lithuanian National Symphony Orchestra, conducted by Robertas Šervenikas, performed works by Latėnas including chamber music and Agnus Dei for choir, organ and orchestra.

Latėnas died at age 64. He was buried at Antakalnis Cemetery three days later.

Work 
Latėnas composed incidental music for 200 drama and puppet theatre productions, often recognized by awards. Even his non-theatrical works often sound dramatic. He named his style "post-social realism", expressing emotional aspects such as "joy, sadness and sarcasm". He composed for a 2019 Dutch-Lithuanian collaboration for The King Ubu at the Lele Theatre.

He also composed soundtracks for nine films, including My Little Wife, The Children from the Hotel America and Wooden Staircase, and for 20 documentaries, and music for five television productions. He said: 

The 1978 Cello Sonata was recorded by David Geringas and Indrė Baikštytė in a collection "Sound of Lithuania". Chamber music by Latėnas was recorded in 2006, including the Flute Sonata (1977), the Cello Sonata (1978), the Violin Sonata (1983) and the String Quartet No. 2 "Šviesiam atminimui" ("In loving memory", 1986). The composer said that he dedicated the string quartet "to the loving memory of all the good friends who emigrated from Lithuania; it's music for the loving memory of all the happy moments I've experienced; it is music for a loving memory of all dear people who are no longer with us". Another CD, ...in extremis..., included in 2008 the String Quartet No. 1 "...in extremis...", piano music, and the Rondo Sonata for Saxophone and Piano.

References

External links 
 
 
 
 
 
 Valdas Vasiliauskas: The drama of independence / Eimuntas Nekrošius and Lithuania’s Youth Theatre eurozine.com 23 May 2018

1956 births
2020 deaths
Lithuanian film score composers
Theatre managers and producers
20th-century Lithuanian politicians
Male film score composers
20th-century composers
20th-century male musicians
21st-century composers
21st-century male musicians
21st-century Lithuanian politicians
Recipients of the Lithuanian National Prize
Lithuanian Academy of Music and Theatre alumni
People from Zarasai District Municipality
Burials at Antakalnis Cemetery